Clarence William Whitehead Mayhew (March 1, 1906 – February 13, 1994) was an American architect best known as a designer of residential structures in the San Francisco Bay Area. Recognition came to him with a home designed in 1937 for the Manor family in Orinda, California; one which was included as an example of modern architecture's effect on the contemporary ranch house in California in several post-war published compilations of residential works.

Career
Mayhew took a job in San Francisco with well-known architect Arthur Brown Jr. sometime around 1922, working as a draftsman. Brown encouraged Mayhew to study at l'École des Beaux-Arts in Paris for two years; Mayhew finished in 1925. Returning to California, Mayhew obtained his architect degree from the University of California, Berkeley, in 1927. Mayhew was subsequently hired by Miller and Pflueger and worked with that firm for six years during a time when they were designing prominent skyscrapers and movie palaces as well as taking occasional commissions for residential dwellings. In 1934 or 1935, Mayhew formed his own firm: Clarence W.W. Mayhew, Architect.

Mayhew's influential Manor House was designed in 1937 for Marjorie and Harold V. Manor. Manor was a San Francisco native who married Marjorie W. Arnold in 1908. He joined three different garden clubs including the California Horticultural Society. The house that Mayhew designed for the Manors was basically a ranch house in structure, but light and airy with floor-to-ceiling windows and extensive skylights. It received notice across the country for its clean, light, asymmetrical lines and its embrace of both indoor and outdoor spaces. Its U-shaped plan enclosed a central lawn, and cost US$14,500 to build in 1938. A series of publications made mention of the design—it appeared in House and Garden, Architect and Engineer, Progressive Architecture, Modern House in America, Tomorrow's House and If You Want to Build a House. In 1974, architectural historian David Gebhard wrote of the design: "...California’s ability to wed indoors and outdoors was beautifully captured in the solarium, with its glass roof, sliding glass walls, and the adjacent sliding glass walls of the living room. This house was a realization of flexible indoor/outdoor space, so often discussed by the exponents of modernism but never achieved in such a lyric fashion." Mayhew was quoted in Architectural Forum in 1939 as saying that "the house has a Japanese character in both plan and elevation. Although I did not copy any Japanese details, I did copy the underlying principle."

Mayhew designed his own house in collaboration with Serge Chermayeff, associate architect and employee of Mayhew's during 1940–1941 when Chermayeff was also teaching at California School of Fine Arts. Chermayeff was brought in so that Mayhew would not have his own wife for a client. The house contrasted sharply with existing homes on Hampton Road, and appeared to be made of rectangular shapes descending the sloped property. The house divided into two functional groups, one for adults and one for children, with all living and sleeping rooms facing south. Glass walls were specified to allow maximum sunlight and viewing pleasure. The two main structural units enclosed a private garden and were connected by a broad stairway enclosed against the weather, with the street side made of solid wood and the garden side fully glazed. The three children's rooms were separated with demountable hanging walls that could be changed to adapt to the family's needs. Author Alan Hess wrote in 2007 that the clean abstraction of the rectilinear blocks appeared to be based on Chermayeff's Bauhaus leanings but that the casual, site-specific interaction of garden, house and modernity showed the relaxation of California living apparent in Mayhew's prior work.

Mayhew designed two alumni houses for local colleges. The Reinhardt Alumnae House was completed in 1949 for Mills College, and the Alumni House was finished in 1953 for the University of California, Berkeley. The latter structure, made for US$375,000 out of stone, brick, steel and glass and organized into two wings in the International style, was mentioned twice in Progressive Architecture, receiving notice in the Progressive Architecture Annual Design Survey for 1954 (Education).

Social activities
Mayhew was an active member of the Bohemian Club and The Family. He served as "Father" at The Family and took part in the Bohemian Club's summer encampments at the Bohemian Grove where he directed the Lecture series for 20 years and was known as "Hap". He volunteered with the props and sets department in at least one Grove Play: Birds of Rhiannon (1930) and in 1969 he gave a Lakeside Talk.

Mayhew was a board member of the San Francisco Museum of Modern Art and of the Talent Bank. He joined the St. Francis Yacht Club and the California Pioneers. Late in life, Mayhew developed Parkinson's disease. He and his wife Joan Virginia Rapp Mayhew moved to San Rafael together. Mayhew died there in 1994; Joan died in 2005 at age 91, survived by their daughter, Joan Mayhew Beales.

Works
1929 – Brat House, Friedman Residence, Woodside, California
1930–1931 – McGuire House Project, Wildwood Gardens, Piedmont, California
1935 – Edward G. Mayhew House, Oakland, California
1936 – Oakland House, Oakland, California
1937 – Manor House, Monte Vista, Orinda, California
1937–1938 – Rowell House, Berkeley, California
1938 – Morgan House, San Rafael, California
1938 – McHale House, Oakland, California
1939 – Sebree House, Berkeley, California
1941–1942 – Clarence W.W. Mayhew House, 330 Hampton Road, Piedmont, California
1941–1942 – St. Germain Avenue (Clarendon Heights View Home), San Francisco, California
1945–1946 – Shingle House, San Francisco, California
1947 – Hale House, Hillsborough, California
1949 – Aurelia Henry Reinhardt Alumnae House, Mills College, Oakland, California
1952–1953 – Alumni House, University of California, Berkeley
1952–1953 – Kaiser Foundation Medical Center, Walnut Creek, California
Kaiser Foundation Hospital, Panorama City, California
Kaiser Foundation Hospital, Harbor City, California
1953 – Scenic Road House, Carmel-by-the-Sea, California
1955 – Mountain Avenue House, Piedmont, California
1958 – Packard House, Los Altos Hills, California
1958 -  Raphel House, Oakland, California
1960 – Piedmont House, Piedmont, California
1961–1962 – Manning's Restaurant, Pasadena, California
1962–1964 – Manning's Cafeteria, Ballard, Seattle, Washington
1964 – Steen Mansion, Washoe Valley, Nevada
Gates Rubber Company Building, Denver, Colorado
Packard House, Big Sur, California
Racetrack, Lima, Peru

References
Notes

External links

1906 births
1994 deaths
People from San Rafael, California
Architecture in the San Francisco Bay Area
20th-century American architects